Selecta may refer to:

Business
 Selecta (dairy products), a Philippine brand of milk and ice cream products
 Selecta (company), a European vending services operator

Music
 Selecta, or selector, slang term for a DJ
 "Selecta" (song), 2011 Afrojack song